Philip John Parkinson (born 1 December 1967) is an English professional football manager and former player who played as a midfielder. He is currently manager of National League side Wrexham.

Parkinson is the only manager to take an English fourth-tier league club to the final of a major cup competition at Wembley Stadium, leading Bradford City of League Two to the 2013 League Cup final.

Playing career

Early playing career
Parkinson, a former Southampton trainee, made his Football League debut in 1988 with Bury, and later joined Reading for £50,000 in July 1992.

Reading
Parkinson was named player of the season two years in a row (1997–98 and 1998–99) and was also a key member of the 1993–94 Football League Second Division championship-winning team. He captained the team to promotion from the Second Division in 2001–02 and soon after promotion success, Parkinson celebrated his testimonial year with a memorable night at Madejski Stadium, where 20,000 fans watched former Reading teammates such as Shaka Hislop, Michael Gilkes and Jeff Hopkins take on an England XI including the likes of Paul Gascoigne, John Barnes and Chris Waddle. Parkinson's final competitive appearance for Reading was a League Cup defeat against Cambridge United on 10 September 2002.

Although Parkinson rarely featured on the field in his final season as Reading returned to the First Division, he remained a well-respected member of the squad until his departure to Layer Road.

In a vote to compile the Royals' best-ever XI, Parkinson was voted the best central midfielder with 60.3% of the vote.

Managerial career

Colchester United
Parkinson left Reading early in 2003 after 11 seasons to take his first steps in management with Colchester United. Despite showing promising signs as he steered the U's to safety upon arrival in February 2003, the 2003–04 season started poorly as Colchester slipped to three straight league defeats, only softened by a victory in the League Cup. Colchester's form improved and a strong FA Cup run, LDV run and a good finish to the season left optimism for U's supporters.

The 2005–06 season saw them finish in second place, thereby gaining an unlikely promotion to the Championship, despite having the lowest average attendance of the division. However, he resigned in June 2006 with a year left to run on his contract.

Hull City
Parkinson was confirmed as the new manager of Hull City in late June 2006, following the departure of Peter Taylor. Hull agreed to pay Colchester £400,000 compensation. When he led Hull against his old club, however, he was embarrassed as his former club romped home 5–1. After another defeat in the next match at home to Southampton 4–2, he left by "mutual consent" in early December, leaving Hull in the relegation zone.

Charlton Athletic
Parkinson then joined Charlton Athletic in January 2007 as assistant manager to Alan Pardew, having previously worked together at Reading. He was close to a return to management with Huddersfield Town in April 2007, but made a last-minute decision to remain with Charlton. Parkinson later extended his contract with Charlton until 2010. Following Pardew's departure in November 2008, he was appointed caretaker manager and given the job permanently on New Year's Eve 2008, despite failing to win any of his eight matches in caretaker charge. Under his management, Charlton were relegated to the third tier of English football for the first time in nearly 30 years.

In League One, Charlton started off very well, winning their first six league matches, but that run was brought to an end after a 1–1 draw at home to Southampton, Parkinson's ex-manager Alan Pardew's side. Charlton continued to do well and were in the top two until the new year where Norwich overtook them and they then never returned to the top two, finishing fourth in the league. In the play-offs, they had to play Swindon Town over the two legs and lost the first one 2–1 at the County Ground. In the second, however, they turned it around and led 2–0 but Swindon fought back and it finished 3–3 on aggregate. Swindon then continued and won on penalties 5–4 to condemn Parkinson and his men to another season in League One. Having not won a league game since November, Parkinson was sacked on 4 January 2011, the day after his side's 4–2 loss at home to Swindon.

Bradford City
Parkinson was appointed manager of Bradford City on 28 August 2011. He won the League Two Manager of the Month award for December 2011 after victories over promotion candidates Shrewsbury Town and Crewe Alexandra. Parkinson also enjoyed a promising run in the Johnstones Paint Trophy with the Bantams taking them to the Northern division semi-finals with victories over Yorkshire rivals Sheffield Wednesday and Sheffield United as well as an away victory against local rivals Huddersfield Town on penalties, however their run ended with a defeat to Oldham Athletic. He led Bradford to safety finishing 18th in League Two, then stating that he wanted a promotion push for next season.

On 11 December 2012, Parkinson's Bradford side progressed to the semi-final of the League Cup after an historic victory over Premier League club Arsenal after a penalty shoot-out.

Parkinson then led Bradford to another historic victory in the first leg of the League Cup semi-finals at Valley Parade, defeating Premier League Aston Villa 3–1 in front of 23,245 fans. Despite a 2–1 defeat in the second leg at Villa Park, Bradford won the tie 4–3 on aggregate to progress to the 2013 League Cup Final at Wembley Stadium. In the final, Bradford lost 5–0 to Premier League Swansea City. After the match, Parkinson criticised referee Kevin Friend for sending Matt Duke off, which resulted in a penalty and described the match as "harsh".

His role in taking Bradford City to the League Cup final resulted in him being rewarded with the Outstanding Managerial Achievement award. He said in statement, "I'm very honoured to receive this award. My name might be on it but it is a team award – not just the team on the pitch but the team off it as well." A strong run of form towards the end of the season secured City a playoff place. After a win over two legs against Burton Albion, Bradford City were promoted to League One after beating Northampton Town, 3–0. After the match, reflecting on all that Parkinson and the rest of the team had achieved during this remarkable season, he said it was beyond his wildest dreams. Shortly after, Parkinson signed a new three-year deal with the club, along with coaches Steve Parkin and Nick Allamby.

Parkinson would follow up the groundbreaking 2012–13 cup upsets with a historic 4–2 victory over Chelsea at Stamford Bridge. Bradford City went 2–0 in the first half, but fought back in stunning fashion to record what Robbie Fowler called the "greatest FA Cup upset of all time". Fans of Bradford City have gone on to call him, the real "special one" following the win at Stamford Bridge. Bradford are still the only team, at any level, to have ever overcome a 2–0 deficit at Stamford Bridge and win during the reign of José Mourinho. Mourinho entered the Bradford dressing room after the game and shook the hand of every player as a sign of his respect.

Bradford City followed up their historic victory against Chelsea with a 2–0 win in the 5th round at home to Sunderland on 15 February 2015. Their cup run ended in the quarter-final with a 3–0 defeat to Championship side Reading on 16 March.

Bradford reached the League One play-offs in the 2015–16 season under Parkinson's management, but exited at the semi-finals after being beaten 4–2 on aggregate over two legs by Millwall.

Parkinson was the fifth longest serving manager in English league football at the conclusion of the 2015–16 season, having been with Bradford for 4 years and 286 days. His time in charge of the club came to an end in June 2016, however, as Parkinson left Bradford to join Bolton Wanderers, who had recently been relegated into League One.

Bolton Wanderers
On 10 June 2016, both Parkinson and assistant manager Steve Parkin signed two-year deals to join Bradford's fellow League One side Bolton, thus ending Wanderers' three-month search for a replacement for Neil Lennon. Parkinson led Bolton to an unbeaten first month of the season, topping the table and winning League One's August Manager of the Month award. This was Bolton's best start to a season in 82 years. After failing to win any games in September, Parkinson was named manager of the month again for October - his second in the first three months of the season. Parkinson won the award for the third time that season in March 2017, with Bolton seven points clear of third place.

Bolton ended the season with a 3–0 win against Peterborough United which was enough to seal promotion back to the Championship at the first attempt as runners up. Bolton finished on 86 points, four points ahead of Scunthorpe United in third. Promotion was achieved in spite of the club being under a transfer embargo imposed by the EFL, with Bolton limited to free transfers and short-term loan deals, whilst remaining under a pre-determined wage cap.

Parkinson's newly promoted Bolton side struggled at the beginning of the 2017–18 season, only earning their first win of the season against Sheffield Wednesday in mid-October, as the club languished at the foot of the Championship table with just five points from 12 games, six points adrift of safety. Parkinson's side would subsequently embark on a six-game unbeaten run following the win, however the club remained inside the relegation zone at its conclusion, having drawn five of the six games. Such was the poor start to the season, it took Parkinson's reinvigorated Bolton side until early December to emerge from the relegation zone, after beating Barnsley 3–1 at home. Bolton earned their first away victory of the season on 30 December 2017, producing a shock 1–0 win at high-flying Sheffield United. Parkinson's Bolton side won back-to-back league matches for the first time since winning promotion on 1 January 2018, by defeating struggling Hull City 1–0. The result saw Bolton emerge from the relegation zone on New Year's Day. Bolton's improved results coincided with Gary Madine hitting form, with the striker scoring the only goals in both victories to bring his tally for the season up to nine goals.

Parkinson resigned as Bolton manager on 21 August 2019.

Sunderland
On 17 October 2019, Parkinson was unveiled as the Sunderland manager on a two and a half-year contract. He parted company with Sunderland on 29 November 2020.

Wrexham
On 1 July 2021, Parkinson was appointed manager of National League side Wrexham on a 12-month rolling contract. Parkinson was awarded the National League Manager of the Month award for March 2022 after leading the team to four wins and a draw. This award came two days after Wrexham had defeated league leaders Stockport County 2–0 in the FA Trophy semi-final to win a place in the final at Wembley against Bromley.

Managerial statistics

Honours
Colchester
League One runner-up: 2005–06

Bradford City
League Two play-offs: 2012–13
EFL Cup runner-up: 2012–13

Bolton Wanderers
League One runner-up: 2016–17

Wrexham
FA Trophy runner-up: 2021–22

Individual
LMA Special Merit Award: 2013
LMA FA Cup Manager of the Year: 2015
Football League/EFL Outstanding Managerial Achievement: 2013
Football League/EFL League One Manager of the Month: January 2006, August 2009, November 2010, December 2014, August 2016, October 2016, March 2017, January 2020
Football League/EFL League Two Manager of the Month: December 2011.
LMA Manager of the Month: 
 League One - March 2003, September 2003, January 2006, August 2009, November 2010, December 2014, August 2016, October 2016, March 2017.
 League Two - December 2011.
 National League Manager of the Month: March 2022, September 2022, January 2023

References

External links

BBC Essex interview on 6 May 2006 on achieving promotion with Colchester United

League Managers Association profile

1967 births
Living people
Sportspeople from Chorley
English footballers
Association football midfielders
Southampton F.C. players
Bury F.C. players
Reading F.C. players
English Football League players
English football managers
Colchester United F.C. managers
Hull City A.F.C. managers
Charlton Athletic F.C. managers
Bradford City A.F.C. managers
Bolton Wanderers F.C. managers
Sunderland A.F.C. managers
Wrexham A.F.C. managers
English Football League managers